The Billboard Hot Dance Club Songs chart is a chart that ranks the best-performing singles in that category in the United States. The first number one song of the year was claimed by Lady Gaga with "Bad Romance", a position it held in the last week of 2009, thus spending two weeks atop the chart in total. Multiple artists achieved two number one songs on the chart, including Jennifer Lopez with "Louboutins" and "Fresh Out the Oven", the latter of which was a collaboration with Pitbull and released under Lopez's pseudonym "Lola". Christina Aguilera also achieved two number one songs with "Not Myself Tonight" and "You Lost Me", while Shakira topped the chart with "Did It Again (Lo Hecho Esta Hecho)" and "Loca", a collaboration with Dizzee Rascal. Australian singer-songwriter Kylie Minogue scored two number one songs with "All the Lovers" and "Get Outta My Way".

Beyoncé and Katy Perry were the only artists to achieve three number one songs in 2010; the former with "Why Don't You Love Me", "Telephone", a collaboration with Lady Gaga featuring Beyoncé, and "Video Phone", another collaboration between the two, but with Beyoncé featuring Lady Gaga. Perry attainted three number one songs with "California Gurls", a collaboration with Snoop Dogg, "Teenage Dream", and the promotional single "Peacock". Gaga and Rihanna were the only artists to top the chart four times each. As well as "Bad Romance", "Telephone" and "Videophone", Gaga also reached number one with "Alejandro". Rihanna topped the chart with "Russian Roulette", "Hard", a collaboration with Jeezy, "Rude Boy", and "Only Girl (In the World)". Goldfrapp's "Rocket", which peaked at number one on May 1, ranked at number one on the 2010 Hot Dance Club Songs year end chart.

These are the Billboard Hot Dance Club Play and Singles Sales number-one hits of 2010.

See also
List of number-one dance airplay hits of 2010 (U.S.)
2010 in music
List of number-one dance hits (United States)
List of artists who reached number one on the U.S. dance chart

References

2010
United States Dance Club
Number-one dance singles